Killer is the fourth studio album by American rock band Alice Cooper, released in November 1971 by Warner Bros. Records. The album peaked at No. 21 on the Billboard 200 album chart, and the two singles "Under My Wheels" and "Be My Lover" made the Billboard Hot 100 chart.

Songs
Cooper said in the liner notes of A Fistful of Alice (1997) and In the Studio with Redbeard, which spotlighted the Killer and Love It to Death (1971) albums, that the song "Desperado" was written about his friend Jim Morrison, who died the year this album was released. According to an NPR radio interview with Alice Cooper, "Desperado" was written about Robert Vaughn's character from the movie The Magnificent Seven (1960). "Halo of Flies" was, according to Cooper's liner notes in the compilation The Definitive Alice Cooper (2001), an attempt by the band to prove that they could perform King Crimson-like progressive rock suites, and was supposedly about a SMERSH-like organisation. "Desperado", along with "Under My Wheels" and "Be My Lover" have appeared on different compilation albums by Cooper. The song "Dead Babies" stirred up some controversy following the album's release, despite the fact that its lyrics conveyed an "anti-child abuse" message.

Reception

Critical reception

Rolling Stones Lester Bangs gave it a favorable review. He explained that "it brings all the elements of the band's approach to sound and texture to a totally integrated pinnacle that fulfills all the promise of their erratic first two albums" and that "each song on [the] album finds him in a different role in the endless movie he is projecting on them." He concluded by calling Alice Cooper "a strong band, a vital band, and they are going to be around for a long, long time." Robert Christgau rated the album a B−, stating that "a taste for the base usages of hard rock rarely comes with a hit attached these days, much less 'surreal', 'theatrical', and let us not forget 'transvestite' trappings". However, he said that "[the album] falters after 'Under My Wheels' and 'Be My Lover', neither of them an 'I'm Eighteen' in the human outreach department." AllMusic's Greg Prato rated "Killer" four-and-a-half out of five stars. He stated that "disturbing tracks ... fit in perfectly" and that "other songs were even more exceptional". He concluded by pointing out that "it rewarded them as being among the most notorious and misunderstood entertainers, thoroughly despised by grownups."

Charts
The album reached  on the Billboard album chart and two singles made the Hot 100 chart. "Be My Lover" reached  on the Billboard chart and "Under My Wheels" reached .

 Certifications 

Live performances
Killer is the third-most-represented album in Alice Cooper's concert setlists behind Welcome to My Nightmare (1975) and Billion Dollar Babies (1973), accounting for 13.3 percent of the songs he has played live. Alongside Welcome to My Nightmare, it is one of only two Alice Cooper albums where every song has been played live, although “Yeah, Yeah, Yeah” has never been played since the end of the supporting Killer Tour, while “You Drive Me Nervous” was not played subsequent to the Killer Tour until 1999, and has never been performed since 2006. “Desperado” was performed only once prior to the Trash Tour in 1989, but has been frequently played live since.

Influence
John Lydon of the Sex Pistols and Public Image Ltd called Killer the greatest rock album of all time. Punk icons Jello Biafra and the Melvins covered the song "Halo of Flies" on their 2005 release Sieg Howdy!. Minneapolis rock band Halo of Flies took their name from this song as well. Rockabilly musicians Mojo Nixon and Skid Roper covered the song "Be My Lover" on their 1986 release Frenzy. Heavy metal band Iced Earth covered the song "Dead Babies" for their 2002 release Tribute to the Gods. Guns N' Roses (featuring Alice Cooper) covered the song "Under My Wheels" on the soundtrack of The Decline of Western Civilization Part II: The Metal Years (1988).

Track listing

Personnel
Credits are adapted from the Killer liner notes.Alice Cooper'
 Alice Cooper – vocals; harmonica
 Glen Buxton – lead guitar
 Michael Bruce – rhythm guitar; keyboards; backing vocals
 Dennis Dunaway – bass guitar; backing vocals
 Neal Smith – drums; backing vocals
with:
 Bob Ezrin – keyboards
 Rick Derringer – additional guitar, "Under My Wheels" and "Yeah, Yeah, Yeah"

References

External links
 
 Alice Cooper Killer Tour Programs

Alice Cooper albums
1971 albums
Albums produced by Bob Ezrin
Warner Records albums